The Momboyo River is a river in the Democratic Republic of the Congo. It joins the Busira River to form the Ruki River, a tributary of the Congo River.

Location

The Momboya and its main tributary the Luilaka are sometimes treated as one river.
The lower  is called the Momboyo, and above this it is called Luilaka.|
The Momboya proper forms to the southeast of the village of Waka, Equateur, just over the border in Tshuapa, where the Luilaka River is joined from the right by the Loile River at Bakako.
It flows with many meanders in a generally northwest direction to its confluence with the Busira River.

Navigation

From its mouth up to Kassa, at  the river is accessible to “C” type tugs pulling a 350 tonne barge.

Human presence

The villages located along the river supply Mbandaka with various food products, the most important being cassava chips, corn and palm oil.
The river waters are polluted by discharge from public markets along the riverside.
This results in water-borne diseases such as diarrhea in the surrounding population.
In 2008 cases of monkeypox were reported in Ingende at the foot of the river and in Boteka, on the Momboya.
The disease is mainly caused in humans by consumption of monkey and squirrel meat.

2018 boat accident

In May 2018 fifty people died when a motorized boat sank during a night voyage on the upper part of the river.
About fifty were saved.
The boat was overloaded, and was travelling at night without lights from the village of Monkoto towards Mbandaka
It sank  from Wafanya.
The accident was caused when the Baleinière, a large wooden boat, collided with a log.
The strong current would have quickly swept the boat away.
Accidents such as this are common on the Congo waterways due to overloading of boats that are in poor condition, combined with lack of life jackets and many passengers who cannot swim.

Notes

Citations

Sources

Rivers of the Democratic Republic of the Congo